Paul Peter "Paulie" Harraka (born September 15, 1989) is an American professional stock car racing driver and entrepreneur. He is a graduate of Duke University and a former representative of NASCAR's Drive for Diversity program.

Personal life
Harraka was born in Wayne, New Jersey. Harraka attended Wayne Valley High School from his freshman through junior years, but spent his senior year at Lake Norman High School to be closer to NASCAR team Joe Gibbs Racing, where he worked as an engineering and research and development intern. During this time, Harraka lived with Kenny Francis, crew chief for Kasey Kahne.

After graduating from high school with a 4.38 GPA. Harraka opted to attend Duke University, stating “I think that in the modern age of racing, knowing all aspects of the business is crucial to being successful." After beginning his studies in Mechanical Engineering, Harraka transferred to Duke's Trinity School of Arts and Sciences, where he studied Markets and Management, Sociology, and History. Harraka is one of only two NASCAR drivers with University degrees, the other being Ryan Newman.

Racing career

Early career
Harraka first sat behind the wheel when he received a backyard fun kart from his family and started driving it around abandoned buildings. Harraka entered his first race on June 1, 1997 at Flemington Speedway, and despite being underage (Harraka was 7 and New Jersey law required that drivers be at least 8 years old), Harraka won. In a karting career that spanned from 1997 to 2005, Harraka amassed a World Karting Association Triple Crown, the Holley Future Star Award, 13 National Championships, and 6 World Championships, and 158 total wins in go-karts. In 2005 he moved from kart to legends car racing, where he won multiple races.

Harraka also won a popular karting event at Mark Dismore's karting facility in Indiana, the RoboPong 200 (now known as the Dan Wheldon Cup after the 2005 winner was killed in October 2011) karting event, teamed with on-sabbatical NASCAR driver Ricky Rudd.

NASCAR

Harraka was invited to the Drive for Diversity Combine in the fall of 2006, where he impressed team owner Bill McAnally. McAnally hired Harraka to compete for his California-based team, despite Harraka still being in high school in New Jersey. Harraka traveled back and forth between New Jersey and California every weekend, and ultimately finished second in the All American Series in Roseville, California that year, winning the Rookie of the Year title. Harraka returned to the team in 2008, this time holding the duties of both driver and crew chief. The team would win 11 out of 23 races as well as the NASCAR Championship.

At the end of 2008, McAnally elected to move Harraka up to the NASCAR K&N Pro Series for the final two races of the season as preparation for a full run in 2009. In the last race of the season, second race for the team, he qualified on the pole and led 40 laps.

Over the next two seasons, Harraka competed full-time for McAnally, first under the NAPA Autocare banner, then with NAPA Filters sponsorship, with crew chief Duane Knorr. The team has won 3 races and has 15 top 5 finishes in 30 total races. They finished 4th and 3rd in the series championship in 2009 and 2010, respectively, with Harraka winning Rookie of the Year in 2009 and Move of the Race in 2010.

Harraka took 2011 off from racing to further his studies, but did run the K&N Pro Series West race at Infineon Raceway. For 2012, Harraka competed in the Camping World Truck Series, running for Rookie of the Year driving for Wauters Motorsports. Midway through the season, Harraka left Wauters Motorsports.

In September 2012, Harraka drove for Go Green Racing in the Nationwide Series at Richmond International Raceway. Harraka's final NASCAR start came at Dover Motor Speedway driving for TriStar Motorsports in the NASCAR Xfinity Series. Harraka then retired from NASCAR to focus on business interests.

Entrepreneurship

Paulie Harraka LLC
In 2011 Harraka partnered with a group of Fortune 500 CEOs, venture capitalists, and professional sports executives as a partner to launch innovative technology platforms that challenge conventional approaches to the sport and business of NASCAR.  The investor group supported Harraka's NASCAR racing activities and entrepreneurial business ventures disruptive to NASCAR.  In November 2013, Harraka delivered a talk chronicling his entrepreneurial ventures at TEDxBeaconStreet in Boston, making Harraka the only NASCAR driver ever to deliver a TED presentation.

Motorsports career results

NASCAR
(key) (Bold – Pole position awarded by qualifying time. Italics – Pole position earned by points standings or practice time. * – Most laps led.)

Sprint Cup Series

Nationwide Series

Camping World Truck Series

 Ineligible for series points

K&N Pro Series West

ARCA Racing Series
(key) (Bold – Pole position awarded by qualifying time. Italics – Pole position earned by points standings or practice time. * – Most laps led.)

References

External links

 

Living people
1989 births
People from Wayne, New Jersey
Wayne Valley High School alumni
Racing drivers from New Jersey
NASCAR drivers
ARCA Menards Series drivers
Duke University Trinity College of Arts and Sciences alumni
American people of Syrian descent
Sportspeople from Passaic County, New Jersey
Businesspeople from New Jersey
21st-century American businesspeople
Stanford Graduate School of Business alumni
Stanford MBA Class of 2018